The list of ship decommissionings in 1959 includes a chronological list of all ships decommissioned in 1959.


See also 

1959
 Ship decommissionings
Ship